Tabei may refer to:
 6897 Tabei, an asteroid named after Junko Tabei
 Besheer El-Tabei (born 1976) a retired Egyptian footballer 
, a Japanese mountaineer

Japanese-language surnames